Magical Mystery is an album by the saxophonist Bud Shank recorded in 1967 for the World Pacific label. The original album included one side interpreting Beatles' songs from the Magical Mystery Tour U.S. album and the other with contemporary pop hits.

Reception

The Allmusic site awarded the album 3 stars.

Track listing
 "Blue Jay Way" (George Harrison) - 3:33 	
 "I Am the Walrus" (John Lennon, Paul McCartney) - 2:54 	
 "The Fool on the Hill" (Lennon, McCartney) - 3:41 	
 "Flying" (Harrison, Lennon, McCartney, Richard Starkey) - 4:01 	
 "Hello Goodbye" (Lennon, McCartney) - 3:23 	
 "Your Mother Should Know" (Lennon, McCartney) - 2:47 	
 "Paper Cup" (Jimmy Webb) - 3:00 	
 "Windy" (Ruthann Friedman) - 2:54 	
 "Never My Love" (Don Addrisi, Richard Addrisi) - 2:56 	
 "I Wanna Be Free" (Tommy Boyce, Bobby Hart) - 2:19 	
 "I Say a Little Prayer" (Burt Bacharach, Hal David) - 3:25

Personnel 
 Bud Shank – alto saxophone, flute 
 Chet Baker – flugelhorn
 Gary Barone – flugelhorn
 Dennis Budimir – guitar
 Herb Ellis – guitar
 Robert West – double bass
 John Guerin – drums
 Victor Feldman – percussion

References 

1968 albums
Bud Shank albums
World Pacific Records albums
Albums produced by Richard Bock (producer)